The White Castle is a radio drama, produced by the ZBS Foundation. It is the twentieth of the Jack Flanders adventure series and the fourth of The Fantastic Voyages of Captain Jack Flanders sub-series. It combines elements of old-time radio with psychic phenomena, supernatural beings and energies.

Plot
Jack and his companions enter The White Castle upon the invitation of its wealthy, eccentric and mysterious owner, Sanford White. But far from being a charming rustic folly, the fortress is full of technology and seems to have detailed information on Jack and Mojo's previous adventures. The very unusual walls have a way of showing you things about yourself that you'd rather not confront.

Credits
 Jack Flanders - Robert Lorick
 Mojo Sam - Dave Adams
 Claudine - Pascale Poirier
 Dominique - Lindsay Ellison
 Rose - Sari Bobbin
 Johnny Seven - Hank Heimark
 Sanford White - John McDonough
 Zeevo - Nebadon Adams
 Producer/Director - Tom Lopez
 Story and Script - M. Fulton
 Music - Tim Clark
 Illustration and Graphics - Jaye Oliver

Environmental sounds recorded in Bali, Sumatra, India, Costa Rica, Tangier and Tunisia by Bobby Bielecki, Connie Kieltyka and Fulton and Clark.

Track List
The White Castle - Disc 1
 1.	The Square Hamburger	10:25
 2.	I Am Sanford White	10:42
 3.	Isn't This Amazing	9:20
 4.	The Sumatra Room	10:16
 5.	We Are Not Alone	10:16
 6.	I Am Who You Are	7:56

The White Castle - Disc 2
 1.	Everything Has a Dark Side	9:16
 2.	White & Black	                9:13
 3.	Smoking Like a Fiend		8:40
 4.	You Cannot Escape Me	4:58
 5.	Ooga Booga Jones	10:06
 6.	Okay, You're On, Boss	7:38

The Fantastic Voyages of Captain Jack Flanders
Jack, Mojo, Claudine and Dominique sail around the Tropics encountering mysterious and other-worldly incidents.
 Orchids and Moonbeams (2005)
 The Ghost Islands (2006)
 Tropical Hot Dog Night (2007)
 The White Castle (2008)

References

External links
 ZBS Foundation
 Whirlitzer of Wisdom fansite

American radio dramas
ZBS Foundation